Sven Klang's Combo is a 1976 Swedish musical drama film directed by Stellan Olsson. The film was based on a 1974 play by Musikteatergruppen Oktober, and was shot in Ängelholm and Höganäs. At the 13th Guldbagge Awards it won the Special Achievement award. In 2012 it was voted one of the 25 best Swedish films of all time.

Cast
 Henric Holmberg as Kennet Persson
 Eva Remaeus as Gunnel Andersson
 Jan Lindell as Rolf
 Anders Granström as Sven Klang
 Bo Gunnar Andersson as Fan
 Christer Boustedt as Lars-Göran Nilsson
 Ingvar Andersson as Man at Filling Station
 Reinhold Andersson as Gottfried Andersson
 Ole Blegel as Man
 Peter Blomberg as Waiter
 Birgit Eggers as Gunnel's Mother

References

External links
 
 

1976 films
1976 drama films
Swedish drama films
1970s Swedish-language films
Films set in 1958
1970s Swedish films